Shekou School Shenzhen is a primary and secondary school in the Shekou area of Nanshan District, Shenzhen, China.

It was formed in 2003 by the merger of Shekou Primary School , which opened in 1945, and Shekou Secondary School , which opened in 1970.

Notes

References

External links
 Shekou School Shenzhen

High schools in Shenzhen
Educational institutions established in 2003
2003 establishments in China